Per Markus Jonsson (born 9 March 1981) is a Swedish former professional footballer who played as a defender. He played for Öster, AIK, Panionios, and Brann during a club career that spanned between 1999 and 2014. A full international between 2007 and 2009, he won four caps for the Sweden national team.

Club career
He was born in Växjö, Sweden, and played seven seasons for his hometown team Östers. In November 2005, Jonsson signed for AIK on a free transfer, and managed to out-compete Jimmy Tamandi for the right-back spot at AIK. Impressive play from Jonsson made him frequently named as a contender for said spot in the national team.

More than just a skilled defender, Jonsson is known for his well-chosen offensive runs and precise crosses, forming a tremendous partnership with right winger Kenny Pavey. An excellent marksman from the penalty spot and AIK's first-choice penalty taker, Jonsson has stated in several interviews that he has never missed a penalty kick in a competitive match as a senior player. According to himself, he converted 25 penalties in a row when playing in Sweden.

In January 2010 he signed for Panionios on a free transfer. After two years in Greece, he signed for the Norwegian club Brann on 16 January 2012.

International career
Jonsson won four caps for the Sweden national team between 2007 and 2009.

Career statistics

Honours 
AIK
 Allsvenskan: 2009
 Svenska Cupen: 2009

References

External links 
 
 

1981 births
Living people
People from Växjö
Swedish footballers
Sweden international footballers
Association football defenders
Östers IF players
AIK Fotboll players
Panionios F.C. players
SK Brann players
Allsvenskan players
Superettan players
Super League Greece players
Eliteserien players
Swedish expatriate footballers
Expatriate footballers in Greece
Expatriate footballers in Norway
Sportspeople from Kronoberg County